The highest-selling albums and EPs in Australia are ranked in the ARIA Albums Chart, published by the Australian Recording Industry Association (ARIA). The data are compiled from a sample that is based on each album's weekly physical and digital sales. There was a total of 21 number-one albums in 2010.

Susan Boyle's I Dreamed a Dream, Eminem's Recovery and Pink's Greatest Hits... So Far!!! were the longest-running number-one albums of the year, with each album scoring six consecutive weeks at the top.

Chart history

Number-one artists

See also
2010 in music
List of number-one singles in Australia in 2010

References

2010
Australia Albums
2010 in Australian music